Rose Hill, also known as the Bedford Brown House, is a historic plantation house located near Locust Hill, Caswell County, North Carolina.  It was built in 1802, and Federal style frame dwelling consisting of two blocks connected by an enclosed breezeway.  The main block is two stories, three bays by two bays, connected to a one-bay by one-bay block by the breezeway.  Also on the property is a contributing is a steep hip-roof smokehouse.  It was the home of U.S. Senator Bedford Brown (1795-1870).

It was added to the National Register of Historic Places in 1973.

References

Plantation houses in North Carolina
Houses on the National Register of Historic Places in North Carolina
Federal architecture in North Carolina
Houses completed in 1790
Houses in Caswell County, North Carolina
National Register of Historic Places in Caswell County, North Carolina